Hendrik Mulderije (4 January 1888, Zutphen – 18 March 1970, Amsterdam) was a Dutch politician of the Christian Historical Union (CHU). He was Minister of Justice in the First Drees cabinet from 1951 to 1952.

References
  Parlement.com biography

1888 births
1970 deaths
Christian Historical Union politicians
20th-century Dutch politicians
20th-century Dutch lawyers
Ministers of Justice of the Netherlands
People from Zutphen
Utrecht University alumni